The Midwest Popular Culture Association / American Culture Association is a regional branch of the Popular Culture Association. The organization held its first conference in Duluth, Minnesota in 1973. After a five-year hiatus during the 1990s, the organization held a conference in Milwaukee, Wisconsin in 2002.

MPCA/ACA usually holds its annual conference in a large Midwestern city in the United States. In the last several years, conferences have been held in Wisconsin, Minnesota, and Ohio. Upcoming conferences will be held in Missouri and Indiana. The conference is typically held in October.

Anyone may join and submit proposals for consideration at the MPCA/ACA conference. Membership in MPCA/ACA is not limited by geographical location, and presenters have come from as far away as Florida, California, Norway, and Australia.

Organizations established in 1973